Raymond Holt (born 29 October 1939 in Thorne, near Doncaster) is a former professional footballer who played in defence for Huddersfield Town, Oldham Athletic, Halifax Town and Scunthorpe United in the Football League.

References

External links
 League stats at Neil Brown's site

1939 births
Living people
People from Thorne, South Yorkshire
Footballers from Doncaster
English footballers
Association football defenders
Huddersfield Town A.F.C. players
Oldham Athletic A.F.C. players
Halifax Town A.F.C. players
Scunthorpe United F.C. players
English Football League players